Kuntanase is a small town and is the capital of Bosomtwe, a district in the Ashanti Region of Ghana.

References

Populated places in the Ashanti Region